Moldova competed in the Summer Olympic Games as an independent nation for the first time at the 1996 Summer Olympics in Atlanta, United States.  Previously, Moldovan athletes competed for the Unified Team at the 1992 Summer Olympics.

Medalists

Silver
 Viktor Reneysky and Nicolae Juravschi — Canoeing, Men's C2 500 metres Canadian Pairs

Bronze
 Sergei Mureiko — Wrestling, Men's Greco-Roman Super Heavyweight (> 100 kg)

Results by event

Archery
In Moldova's debut independent archery competition, veteran and defending bronze medallist Natalia Valeeva was defeated in the third round of competition.

Women's Individual Competition:
 Natalia Valeeva → Round of 16, 12th place (2-1)
 Nadejda Palovandova → Round of 64, 38th place (0-1)

Athletics
Men's 400m Hurdles
 Vadim Zadoinov
 Heat — 49.73s (→ did not advance)

Men's Marathon
 Valery Vlas — 2:28.36 (→ 77th place)

Men's 20 km Walk
 Fedosei Ciumacenco — 1:27:57 (→ 41st place)

Men's 50 km Walk
 Fedosei Ciumacenco — did not start (→ no ranking)

Women's High Jump
 Olga Bolşova
 Qualification — 1.93m
 Final — 1.93m (→ 12th place)

 Inna Gliznuta
 Qualification — 1.85m (→ did not advance)

Boxing
Men's Flyweight (51 kg)
Igor Samoilenco
 First Round — Defeated Omar Adorno (Puerto Rico), 20-8 
 Second Round — Lost to Elias Recaido (Philippines), 8-12

Men's Lightweight (60 kg)
Octavian Țîcu
 First Round — Lost to Tontcho Tontchev (Bulgaria), referee stopped contest in second round

Cycling

Road Competition
Men's Individual Time Trial
Ruslan Ivanov 
 Final — 1:10:55 (→ 27th place)

Igor Bonciukov
 Final — 1:12:48 (→ 33rd place)

Swimming
Men's 50m Freestyle
 Maxim Kazmirchuk
 Heat – 23.78 (→ did not advance, 43rd place)

Men's 100m Butterfly
 Maxim Kazmirchuk
 Heat – 56.46 (→ did not advance, 46th place)

Men's 200m Backstroke
 Artur Elizarov
 Heat – 2:07.86 (→ did not advance, 33rd place)

Men's 100m Breaststroke
 Vadim Tatarov
 Heat – 1:04.87 (→ did not advance, 30th place)

Men's 200m Breaststroke
 Vadim Tatarov
 Heat – 2:21.34 (→ did not advance, 28th place)

Men's 200m Individual Medley
 Serghei Mariniuc
 Heat – 2:04.99
 B-Final – 2:04.11 (→ 13th place)

Men's 400m Individual Medley
 Serghei Mariniuc
 Heat – 4:20.24
 Final – 4:21.15 (→ 8th place)

Weightlifting
Men's Light-Heavyweight
Vadim Vacarciuc
 Final — 165.0 + 202.5 = 367.5 (→ 5th place)

Wrestling 

Men's Freestyle
Vitalie Railean — Light flyweight, 6th place
Nazim Alidjanov — Bantamweight, 14th place
Victor Peicov — Welterweight, 7th place
Gusman Jabrailov — Middleweight, 9th place

Men's Greco-Roman
Igor Grabovetchi — Heavyweight, 6th place
Sergei Mureiko — Super Heavyweight, bronze medal.

References

sports-reference
Official Olympic Reports
International Olympic Committee results database

Nations at the 1996 Summer Olympics
1996
Summer